The Aligarh Nagar Nigam (ANN) – also known as Aligarh Municipal Corporation (AMC) – is the civic body that governs Aligarh city. Established under the Uttar Pradesh Municipal Corporation Act-1959, it is responsible for the civic infrastructure and administration of the city. The first mayor of Aligarh elections were held in 1995. As of 2018, Mohammad Furqan from Bahujan Samaj Party is current mayor of Aligarh Municipal Corporation.

History 
Aligarh Municipal Board (Nagar Palika) was established on 1 August 1885. On November 1994 after enactment of Uttar Pradesh Municipal Corporation Act 1959, it was further upgraded as Municipal Corporation (Nagar Nigam).

Objective 
AMC work for providing necessary community services like health care, educational institution, housing, transport etc. by collecting property tax and fixed grant from the Finance Commission and Government of Uttar Pradesh. Its sources of income are taxes on water, houses, markets, entertainment and vehicles paid by residents of the town and grants from the state government.

Wards
As of 2017, the Aligarh Municipal Corporation's legislature, also known as the Corporation Council, consists of 70 directly elected corporators.

See also
 Aligarh division
 Aligarh district
 Aligarh (Lok Sabha constituency)
 Aligarh (Assembly constituency)

References

Municipal corporations in Uttar Pradesh
Aligarh
1994 establishments in Uttar Pradesh